The Dealu Mare wine region is located within the Muntenia area of Romania. It is located around the municipality of Valea Călugărească in Prahova County, best known for its red wines, and the municipality of Pietroasele in Buzău County, best known for white wines. Typically identified as one of the most important wine regions in Romania, it encompasses about 400 square kilometres under the Southern Carpathians.

Grape varieties 

Red grape varieties grown in Dealu Mare:
 Burgund Mare
 Cabernet Sauvignon
 Feteasca neagra
 Merlot
 Pinot noir
 Zweigelt

White grape varieties grown in Dealu Mare:
 Busuioaca de Bohotin
 Chardonnay
 Feteasca alba
 Feteasca regala
 Muscat Ottonel
 Pinot gris
 Riesling Italico
 Sauvignon blanc
 Tămâioasă Românească

References

External links
 List of wineries from Muntenia and Oltenia

Muntenia
Wine regions of Romania